The County of Holstein-Segeberg was a county in the state of Holstein from 1273 to 1308 and a line of the noble family of Schauenburg and Holstein. The only count of Holstein-Segeberg was Adolphus V, nicknamed the Pomeranian, who was born in 1252 and died in 1308.

History
After the death of his father, John I, in 1263, his sons, Adolphus V, John II and Albert I (died 1300, who became the cathedral provost (Dompropst) of Hamburg) initially ruled the County of Holstein-Kiel jointly. In 1273 they divided the inheritance, with John II continuing to rule Kiel. Adolphus V ruled Segeberg and thus founded the line of Holstein-Segeberg. When he died in 1308 without male issue, Holstein-Segeberg fell once again to Holstein-Kiel. Adolphus, the younger son of Count John II, who was born in 1281, ruled Holstein-Segeberg from 1308 until he was stabbed to death in 1315.

Count Albert II (1369–1403) of Holstein-Rendsburg, second son of Count Henry II (d 1385), received the castle and Vogtei of Segeberg as his own lordship as a result of the partition division of 9 September 1394; and Kiel through the partition treaty of 28 August 1397.

Counties in Holstein (overview)

References

 
Segeberg
Counties of the Holy Roman Empire
Holstein
Kiel